Zardaverine is a dual-selective PDE3/4 phosphodiesterase inhibitor. Studies in vitro suggest that it may have useful anti-cancer properties.

References

Phosphodiesterase inhibitors